"I  Can Tell by the Way You Dance (You're Gonna Love Me Tonight)" is a song written by Sandy Pinkard and Rob Strandlund, and originally recorded by Gary Morris on his 1982 self-titled album. The song was later recorded by American country music artist Vern Gosdin and released in March 1984 as the lead single from his album There is a Season.  The song was Gosdin's eighteenth country hit and the first of three number ones on the country chart.  The single spent one week at number one and a total of fourteen weeks on the country chart.

Background
Gosdin, originally, felt the song was too rock 'n' roll for him and didn't record it for two years after it was presented to him.

Charts

Weekly charts

Year-end charts

References

1984 singles
1982 songs
Gary Morris songs
Vern Gosdin songs